The following lists events that happened in 1926 in Iceland.

Incumbents
Monarch - Kristján X
Prime Minister – Jón Magnússon, Magnús Guðmundsson, Jón Þorláksson

Events
1 July – The Icelandic Coast Guard formally founded
1 July – Icelandic parliamentary election, 1926
8 July – Cabinet of Jón Þorláksson formed
1926 Úrvalsdeild

Births
28 March – Ingvar Gíslason, politician
18 April – Indriði G. Þorsteinsson, writer (d. 2000)
7 November – Ólafur Hannesson, footballer
11 November – Torfi Bryngeirsson, athlete (d. 1995).

Deaths

23 June – Jón Magnússon, politician (b. 1859).
2 July – Kristján Jónsson, politician (b. 1852).

References

 
1920s in Iceland
Iceland
Iceland
Years of the 20th century in Iceland